In kinesiology, the ventilatory threshold (VT1) refers to the point during exercise at which ventilation starts to increase at a faster rate than VO2 (V – volume, O2 – oxygen). One's threshold is said to reflect levels of anaerobiosis and lactate accumulation. As the intensity level of the activity being performed increases, breathing becomes faster; more steadily first and then more rapid as the intensity increases. When breathing surpasses normal ventilation rate, one has reached ventilatory threshold. For most people this threshold lies at exercise intensities between 50% and 75% of VO2 max. A major factor affecting one's ventilatory threshold is their maximal ventilation (amount of air entering and exiting lungs). This is dependent on their personal experience with the activity and how physically fit the person is. Comparison studies of more athletic people have shown that your ventilatory threshold occurs at a higher intensity if you are more active or have been training for that exercise; although, in some cases shorter continuous tests can be used because of rapid alterations in ventilation.

Methods 
 Ventilation Curve – Plot VE vs. VO2 or Watts or Time – The point at which there is a non‐linear increase in ventilation 
 V‐Slope Method – Plot VO2 vs. VCO2 – The point at which the increase in VCO2 is greater than the increase in VO2 
 Ventilatory Equivalents Method – Plot VE/VO2 and VE/VCO2 vs. Watts or time or VO2 – Point at which VE/VO2 increases while VE/VCO2 decreases or stays the same.

Sample values 
Frangolias DD,
Rhodes EC
School of Human Kinetics, University of British Columbia, Vancouver, Canada.
Medicine and Science in Sports and Exercise [1995, 27(7):1007-1013]:

A government experiment to test ventilatory threshold was held between November and December 2004. Subjects included 32 physically active males (age: 22.3; TV: 180.5; TM: 75.5 kg; VO2max: 57.1 mL/kg/min) encountered a continuous test of increasing loads on a treadmill, cardiorespiratory and other variables were observed using ECG (recording of the electrical activity of the heart) and gas analyzer. During the test, subjects were asked to point at a scale from 6 to 20 reflecting their feeling of discomfort. The RPE threshold was recorded as constant value of 12-13. Averages of ventilatory and RPE threshold were conveyed by parameters that were monitored and then compared by using t-test for dependent samples. No significant difference was found between mean values of ventilatory and RPE threshold, when they were expressed by parameters such as: speed, load, heart rate, absolute and relative oxygen consumption. The conclusion of this experiment was: the fixed value (12-13) of RPE scale may be used to detect the exercise intensity that corresponds to ventilatory threshold.

VO2 max levels 

Maximum oxygen intake, VO2, is one of the best measures of cardiovascular fitness and maximal aerobic power. VO2 max averages around 35–40 mL/(kg∙ min) in a healthy male and 27–31 mL/ (kg∙ min) in a healthy female. These scores can improve with training. Factors that affect your VO2 max are age, sex, fitness, training, and genetics. While scores in the upper 80s and 90s have been recorded by legendary endurance athletes such as Greg Lemond, Miguel Indurain, and Steve Prefontaine, most competitive endurance athletes have scores in the mid to high 60s. Cycling, rowing, swimming and running are some of the main sports that push VO2 levels to the maximum. Ventilatory threshold and lactate threshold are expressed as a percentage of VO2 max; beyond this percentage the ability to sustain the work rate rapidly declines as high intensity but short duration energy systems such as glycolysis and ATP-PC are relied on more heavily.

See also 

Anaerobic exercise
Lactate threshold
VO2 max

References 

"Determination of Ventilatory Threshold Based on Subjective Rating of Perceived Exertion." National Center for Biotechnology Information. U.S. National Library of Medicine, n.d. Web. 03 Nov. 2014.
Hoffman, Shirl J. Introduction to Kinesiology: Studying Physical Activity. Champaign, IL: Human Kinetics, 2005
Cheatham, Dr. "Topic 3: Determination of the Lactate and  Ventilatory Thresholds Topic 3: Determination of the Lactate and  Ventilatory Thresholds. Review of Physiology, Methods of Detection, and Application." Web. 30 Aug, 2013.
"Optimize Endurance Training." Optimize Endurance Training. N.p., n.d. Web. 02 Nov. 2014.
"Changes in ventilatory threshold with exercise training in a sedentary population: the HERITAGE Family Study" National Center for Biotechnology Information. U.S. National Library of Medicine, n.d. Web. 03 Nov. 2014.
"Result Filters." National Center for Biotechnology Information. U.S. National Library of Medicine, n.d. Web. 03 Nov. 2014.
"Ventilatory Threshold." TheFreeDictionary.com. N.p., n.d. Web. 03 Nov. 2014.
Fitzgerald, Jason. “ VO2 Max Testing and Ventilatory Threshold: Endurance Testing for Runners.” Strength Running. 25, July 2010. Web. 8, August 2010.
"VO2 Max, Aerobic Power & Maximal Oxygen Uptake." Sports Fitness Advisor.

Exercise physiology
Respiratory physiology
Sports medicine